Nutlins are cis-imidazoline analogs which inhibit the interaction between mdm2 and tumor suppressor p53, and which were discovered by screening a chemical library by Vassilev et al. Nutlin-1, nutlin-2, and nutlin-3 were all identified in the same screen; however, Nutlin-3 is the compound most commonly used in anti-cancer studies.  Nutlin small molecules occupy p53 binding pocket of MDM2 and effectively disrupt the p53–MDM2 interaction that leads to activation of the p53 pathway in p53 wild-type cells. Inhibiting the interaction between mdm2 and p53 stabilizes p53, and is thought to selectively induce a growth-inhibiting state called senescence in cancer cells.  These compounds are therefore thought to work best on tumors that contain normal or "wild-type" p53. Nutlin-3 has been shown to affect the production of p53 within minutes.

The more potent of the two enantiomers, nutlin-3a ((–)-nutlin-3), can be synthesized in a highly enantioselective fashion. Several derivatives of nutlin, such as RG7112 and RG7388 (Idasanutlin) have been developed and progressed into human studies. Imidazoline core based on the methoxyphenyl substituents also stabilizes p53.

References 

Imidazolines